Maugham is a surname most commonly associated with the English literary family. The name is a variant of Malham, Malgham, and Malghum. Families with the name originate from the area surrounding Malham and Kirkby Malham.

Well-known persons with this surname include:
 Robert Ormond Maugham, English barrister and father of Somerset Maugham
 Frederic Maugham, 1st Viscount Maugham, English statesman, the eldest son of the previous
 Robin Maugham, English writer, the only son of the previous
 W. Somerset Maugham, English writer, best known of the Maughams
 Syrie Maugham, wife 
 Daphne Mabel Maugham, painter

References